"Oathkeeper" is the fourth episode of the fourth season of HBO's medieval fantasy television series Game of Thrones. The 34th episode overall, "Oathkeeper" was written by Bryan Cogman and directed by Michelle MacLaren. It first aired on HBO on April 27, 2014.

In the episode, the residents of King's Landing deal with the aftermath of Joffrey Baratheon's murder; Daenerys Targaryen continues her conquest of Meereen; Sansa Stark and Petyr "Littlefinger" Baelish sail in the Narrow Sea; and Alliser Thorne agrees to let Jon Snow take a group of volunteers north of the Wall to eliminate the mutineers at Craster's Keep. The episode's title refers to the new sword gifted to Brienne of Tarth by Jaime Lannister, and the themes of duty that propel the episode.

The episode features the first substantive appearance of the Night King, the leader of the White Walkers—-following a second-long appearance in a vision sequence in two episodes prior (“The Lion and the Rose”—-though he was not identified as such until the following year.

Plot

In Meereen
Missandei continues to teach Grey Worm the Common Tongue, the language of Westeros. Grey Worm and other Unsullied infiltrate the city, arm the slaves and incite a slave uprising that leaves Daenerys in control of the city. Despite Barristan's suggestion to offer mercy, Daenerys orders 163 masters crucified as justice for the 163 slave children crucified along the road to Meereen.

In King's Landing
Jaime visits Tyrion in his cell and tells him that Cersei is still searching for Sansa.

Olenna prepares to return to Highgarden and implies to Margaery that she had a hand in Joffrey's death to protect Margaery from his cruelty. She also suggests that Margaery ingratiate herself with Tommen to curtail Cersei's influence; at night, Margaery visits Tommen in his chambers to discuss their marriage.

Jaime sends Brienne to find and protect Sansa and gives her armor and his Valyrian steel sword, which she names "Oathkeeper", and Podrick as her squire.

In the Narrow Sea
On the way to the Eyrie, Petyr tells Sansa that he plans to marry her aunt Lysa. He tells her that Joffrey's death will help him and his new allies grow strong, referring to House Tyrell, and that the missing stone in her necklace contained the poison used for the murder.

At the Wall
Slynt convinces Thorne to send Jon to kill the group at Craster's Keep, as Jon may be killed and not become Lord Commander. Jon gathers volunteers to join him, including Locke who arrived as a new recruit.

Beyond the Wall
Karl orders Rast to give Craster's last son to the White Walkers. Bran's group hears the baby's cries and are captured by the mutineers when they investigate. A White Walker retrieves Craster's son and brings him to a fortress in the Lands of Always Winter, where their leader, the Night King, transforms the baby into a White Walker.

Production 

"Oathkeeper" was written by Bryan Cogman based on A Storm of Swords. Reviewer Walt Hickey of FiveThirtyEight notes that the episode "contained the final scene of Jaime Lannister’s ninth "Storm of Swords" chapter. But lots of material from that chapter hasn't been on the show yet, so I reasoned that he has completed only eight." In addition to chapter 72 (Jaime IX), some of the content from this episode is also found in A Storm of Swords chapters 61, 68, and 71 (Sansa V, Sansa VI, Daenerys VI).

Theresa DeLucci, a reviewer for Tor.com, notes that the episode "didn't even take liberties with the books; it completely made up whole new stories" that do not appear in A Storm of Swords, including conversations between Missandei and Grey Worm, Bran's appearance at Craster's keep, and the final White Walker scene. Reviewers from IGN applauded the new material, noting that the scenes at Craster's keep "give Bran something to do" and hint at the nature of the White Walkers. Erik Kain, of Forbes magazine, notes these departures from the books as well, stating that the episode departed as much from the books as any episode thus far in the HBO adaptation of Martin's book series. These deviations, notes Kain, "leave both readers and newcomers to the story of Westeros and its motley band of heroes and villains entirely uncertain as to what's coming next."

Reception

Ratings 
"Oathkeeper" established a new series high in ratings, with 6.95 million people watching the premiere. In the United Kingdom, the episode was viewed by 1.598 million viewers, making it the highest-rated broadcast that week. It also received 0.112 million timeshift viewers.

Critical reception 
Like the season's other episodes, "Oathkeeper" received acclaim from critics, with Rotten Tomatoes counting 97% positive reviews from among 36. The site's consensus is that "If it's a bit more subdued than its predecessors, 'Oathkeeper' is nonetheless a rock-solid installment of Game of Thrones – one that features assured direction, strong action scenes, and intriguing plot developments."

Eric Goldman and Roth Cornet of IGN commented on the episode being a "game changer" because it diverges from the book series more than any other Game of Thrones episode; a few of the changes include Jon's and Bran's storylines, how Daenerys conquered Meereen, and new information with regard to how White Walkers multiply their army. Goldman and Cornet stated that much of the episode feels like a spoiler for readers of the series because of the changes, including the show creators, who know how the ongoing book series will end, possibly having incorporated aspects that happen later in the books. Though Goldman and Cornet indicated that significantly diverging from the books could be detrimental to the show, they credited "Oathkeeper" with adding an element of surprise and intrigue for all viewers.

Writing for The A.V. Club, Emily VanDerWerff (writing for viewers who have read the books) and Erik Adams (writing for viewers who have not) both gave the episode a B. VanDerWerff commented that the scenes between Jamie and Cersei "seems to truly want us to think that what happened last week wasn't, in any way, rape" and wondered "whether the show is going to acknowledge it at all." Adams notes how the episode serves as a "bridge" between episodes and plotlines well under way, but that there are "thematic riches" to be found; namely, the multiple searches for justice.

Accolades

References

External links 

  at HBO.com
 

2014 American television episodes
Game of Thrones (season 4) episodes